Ljósufjöll is a fissure vent system and central volcano on the Snæfellsnes Peninsula in Iceland.  The system has a length of about 90 km.

The volcanic system contains cinder cones and is the only system on the peninsula that has erupted in recorded history.  The eruption took place in the 12th century (1148) and cost the lives of around 80 people. One of them was the then bishop of Skálholt, Magnús Einarsson.

The name derives from the central volcano and translates into English as "Mountains of the Light".  The system is the largest Quaternary rhyolitic outcrop in the Snæfellsnes volcanic zone and as such the central volcano is highly silicic which causes the light coloration.

See also
 List of volcanoes in Iceland
 Volcanism of Iceland

References

External links 
 Ljósufjöll in the Catalogue of Icelandic Volcanoes

Volcanoes of Iceland
Fissure vents
VEI-3 volcanoes
Active volcanoes
Snæfellsnes
Volcanic systems of Iceland
Snæfellsnes Volcanic Belt